Table tennis was contested in the 1998 Asian Games held in Bangkok, Thailand from  December 8 to December 16, 1998. China maintained its dominance in the event and won total nine medals, with six golds. Kim Taek-soo of South Korea was the only non-Chinese player who won a gold medal, and with his medal South Korea finished second in medal table, with total eight medals. North Korea and Hong Kong both achieved one silver and one bronze, and finished tied at a third spot in a medal table rankings.

Medalists

Medal table

References

External links
 1998 Asian Games official website

 
1998 Asian Games events
1998
Asian Games
1998 Asian Games